Legião Futebol Clube, commonly known as Legião, is a Brazilian football club based in Brasília, Distrito Federal. They competed in the Série C once.

History
The club was founded on May 11, 2006. Legião won the Campeonato Brasiliense Third Level in 2006, after defeating Brasília in the final. They competed in the Série C in 2008, when they were eliminated in the First Stage of the competition. Legião was promoted to the 2012 Campeonato Brasiliense after finishing in the fourth position in the 2011 Campeonato Brasiliense Second Level.

Achievements

 Campeonato Brasiliense Third Level:
 Winners (1): 2006

Stadium

Legião Futebol Clube play their home games at Estádio Nacional de Brasília, commonly known as Estádio Mané Garrincha. The stadium has a maximum capacity of 69,349 people.

References

Association football clubs established in 2006
Football clubs in Brasília
2006 establishments in Brazil